The Eastern League (EL) is a Minor League Baseball (MiLB) sports league that has operated under that name since 1938, with the exception of the 2021 season, during which the league operated under the moniker Double-A Northeast. The league has played at the Double-A level since 1963, and consists primarily of teams located in the Northeastern United States.

History
The league was founded in 1923 as the New York–Pennsylvania League. The first team outside the two original states was created in 1936 when the York White Roses of York, Pennsylvania, moved to Trenton, New Jersey, and were renamed the Trenton Senators. The league was renamed as the Eastern League in 1938 when the Scranton Miners of Scranton, Pennsylvania, moved to Hartford, Connecticut, and became the Hartford Bees. 

The league has had teams in a total of 52 different cities, located in 12 different states and two Canadian provinces. The league consisted of six to eight teams from 1923 until 1993. The league expanded to 10 teams in 1994 with the addition of the Portland Sea Dogs and the New Haven Ravens and split into two divisions, the Northern Division and the Southern Division. The league expanded to 12 teams in 1999 with the addition of the Altoona Curve and the Erie SeaWolves. The two divisions were restructured and renamed for the 2010 season as the Eastern Division and the Western Division because the Connecticut Defenders moved to Richmond, Virginia, after the 2009 season, becoming the Richmond Flying Squirrels.

The start of the 2020 season was postponed due to the COVID-19 pandemic before ultimately being cancelled.

As part of Major League Baseball's 2021 reorganization of the minor leagues, the league was temporarily renamed the "Double-A Northeast"; the Somerset Patriots, formerly an independent team, joined the league, while the Trenton Thunder were relegated to the newly-formed MLB Draft League. Following MLB's acquisition of the rights to the names of the historical minor leagues, the Double-A Northeast was renamed the Eastern League effective with the 2022 season.

Current teams

Complete list of Eastern League teams (1923–present)

Notes: This list includes teams in predecessor New York–Pennsylvania League of 1923 to 1937.

Bold font indicates an active Eastern League team.

A "^" indicates that team's article redirects to an article of an active team formerly of the Eastern League.

A "†" indicates that team's article redirects to an article of a defunct Eastern League team.

Akron Aeros^
Akron RubberDucks
Albany Senators
Albany-Colonie A's
Albany-Colonie Yankees
Allentown Brooks
Allentown Cardinals
Allentown Red Sox
Altoona Curve
Berkshire Brewers
Binghamton Rumble Ponies
Binghamton Triplets
Bowie Baysox
Bristol Red Sox
Buffalo Bisons
Canton–Akron Indians
Charleston Indians
Connecticut Defenders
Elmira Colonels
Elmira Pioneers
Elmira Red Jackets
Elmira Red Wings
Elmira Royals
Erie SeaWolves
Glens Falls Tigers
Glens Falls White Sox
Hagerstown Suns
Harrisburg Senators
Hartford Bees†
Hartford Chiefs
Hartford Laurels
Hartford Yard Goats
Hazleton Red Sox
Holyoke Millers
Jersey City A's
Jersey City Indians
Johnstown Johnnies
Johnstown Red Sox
Lancaster Red Roses
London Tigers
Lynn Pirates
Lynn Sailors
Manchester Yankees
Nashua Angels
Nashua Pirates
New Britain Red Sox†
New Britain Rock Cats
New Hampshire Fisher Cats
New Haven Ravens^
Norwich Navigators
Pawtucket Indians
Pawtucket Red Sox
Pittsfield Cubs
Pittsfield Rangers
Pittsfield Red Sox
Pittsfield Senators
Portland Sea Dogs
Québec Carnavals (also as Québec Metros)
Reading Fightin Phils
Reading Indians^
Reading Phillies^
Reading Red Sox
Richmond Flying Squirrels
Schenectady Blue Jays
Scranton Miners
Scranton Red Sox
Shamokin Indians
Sherbrooke Pirates
Somerset Patriots
Springfield Giants
Springfield Nationals
Springfield Rifles
Syracuse Chiefs
Syracuse/Allentown Chiefs
Syracuse Stars

Thetford Mines Miners
Thetford Mines Pirates
Trenton Senators
Trenton Thunder
Trois-Rivières Aigles

Utica Blue Sox
Utica Braves
Utica Indians/Oneonta Indians
Vermont Mariners
Vermont Reds
Waterbury A's
Waterbury Angels
Waterbury Dodgers
Waterbury Giants
Waterbury Indians
Waterbury Pirates
Waterbury Reds
West Haven A's
West Haven White Caps
West Haven Yankees
Wilkes-Barre Barons

Wilkes-Barre Indians
Williamsport A's
Williamsport Billies
Williamsport Bills
Williamsport Grays
Williamsport Mets
Williamsport Tomahawks
Williamsport Tigers
York Pirates
York White Roses

Champions

League champions have been determined by different means since the Eastern League's formation in 1923. Before 1934, the champions were simply the league pennant winners. A formal playoff system to determine league champions was established in 1934.

The Binghamton Triplets have won 10 championships, the most among all teams in the league, followed by the Elmira Colonels/Pioneers/Royals (8) and the Scranton Miners/Red Sox (7). Among active franchises, the Akron Aeros/RubberDucks and Harrisburg Senators have each won 6 championships, the most in the league, followed by the Reading Fightin Phils (4).

Awards
Eastern League Most Valuable Player Award
Eastern League Pitcher of the Year Award
Eastern League Top MLB Prospect Award (formerly the Eastern League Rookie of the Year Award)
Eastern League Manager of the Year Award

See also

List of Eastern League stadiums
Sports attendances

References

External links

 
Sports leagues established in 1923
Minor baseball leagues in the United States